Bourg-la-Reine station (French: Gare de Bourg-la-Reine) is a French railway station on the Sceaux line, located in the town of Bourg-la-Reine (Hauts-de-Seine département).

It is a station of the "Regie Autonome des Transports Parisiens" (RATP) served by trains from line B of the RER.

Railway situation

The station is located at "Point Kilometrique"(PK) 12.9 (PK 0.0 being in Gare du Nord, end of the RATP part), at the junction of the branches of line B of the RER towards Robinson and towards Saint-Rémy-lès -Chevreuse.
The station itself is made up of five tracks, four of which are contiguous to a platform:

track 1 for trains going south, Massy - Palaiseau or Saint-Rémy-lès-Chevreuse;
track 2 for trains going north towards Paris and coming from Massy - Palaiseau or Saint-Rémy-lès-Chevreuse;
track 1a for trains going southwest towards Robinson;
track 2a for trains going north towards Paris and coming from Robinson;
track 4, a small siding located to the west of track 2a, along the platform but not contiguous, often used to park track surveillance trains.

At the north of the station, four sidings allow the parking of trains. Two (tracks 3 and 5) are quite long for 2 EMU Mi79/84 each; two others (tracks 7 and 9), shorter and integrated into a concrete slab, pass under a porch and are used to park construction trains.
The station's rights-of-way include the flying junction, built in the 1930s, as well as the A and B sidings (sometimes used as sidings or for a U-turn) and the 3T siding, all located just north of the flying junction (about 300 meters from the end of the quays to the north).

History

This station has the particularity of constituting a Y, since it is common to the Robinson and Saint-Rémy-lès-Chevreuse branches, which separate shortly before, on the Paris side. During the renovation of the line by the Compagnie du chemin de fer métropolitain de Paris (CMP) in the 1930s, a flying junction was created to avoid conflicts between trains traveling in the opposite direction at the junction. .

In the early 2000s, this station was the subject of major works consisting of creating a new access leading directly to the connecting corridor, the installation of three elevators (one for each platform) and the renovation of the historic passenger building. . This station is now fully accessible to people with reduced mobility.

After the separation the central platform in two, there is an electrical substation and, remembering the Sceaux line before the RER, a metro logo carved out of hedges. In addition, another particularity of this station, the service plans were the first of the new generation to be installed on the RER A/B network.

In 2020 a new forecourt and new bus station are built

In 2016, according to RATP estimates, annual ridership was 4,462,976 travelers

Connection

The station is served by:

Bus lines 6, 7 and 17 of the Le Paladin bus network

Gallery

References

See also

 List of stations of the Paris RER

Réseau Express Régional stations in Hauts-de-Seine
Railway stations in France opened in 1846